A Pilgrim's Tale is a studio album by English folk musician Seth Lakeman. It was released on 7 February 2020 under BMG Rights Management.

The album is inspired by the English ship Mayflower and its four-centuries since the first departure from the UK. English actor, Paul McGann, features on the album as narrator, alongside Cara Dillon, Benji Kirkpatrick and Ben Nicholls.

Critical reception
A Pilgrim's Tale was met with generally favorable reviews from critics. At Metacritic, which assigns a weighted average rating out of 100 to reviews from mainstream publications, this release received an average score of 72, based on 4 reviews.

Track listing

Charts

References

2020 albums
Seth Lakeman albums
BMG Rights Management albums